Hughes Memorial may refer to:
 Hughes Memorial Tower in Washington, D.C.
 Alfred W. Hughes Memorial in Corris